Valeriya Karavayeva (born 3 August 1993) is a Kazakhstani handball player who plays for the club Almaty Handball. She is member of the Kazakhstani national team. She competed at the 2015 World Women's Handball Championship in Denmark.

References

1993 births
Living people
Kazakhstani female handball players
Handball players at the 2018 Asian Games
Asian Games competitors for Kazakhstan
20th-century Kazakhstani women
21st-century Kazakhstani women